Ancylosis is a genus of snout moth. It was described by Philipp Christoph Zeller in 1839, and is known from South Africa, Uzbekistan, Spain, Turkmenistan, Lebanon, Algeria, Tunisia, Russia, Israel, Palestine, Tinos, Australia, Seychelles, Afghanistan, the United States, Iraq, Namibia, Kazakhstan, Iran, Mauritius, Mozambique, Sarepta, Argentina, Sri Lanka, and Aden.

Species
Subgenus Ancylosis
Ancylosis anguinosella Zeller, 1848
Ancylosis cinnamomella (Duponchel, 1836)
Ancylosis dryadella (Ragonot, 1887)
Ancylosis imitella Hampson, 1901
Ancylosis sareptalla (Herrich-Schäffer, 1861)
Ancylosis uncinatella (Ragonot, 1890)
Subgenus Heterographis Ragonot, 1885
Ancylosis albicosta (Staudinger, 1870)
Ancylosis convexella (Lederer, 1855)
Ancylosis faustinella (Zeller, 1867)
Ancylosis gracilella (Ragonot, 1887)
Ancylosis harmoniella (Ragonot, 1887)
Ancylosis hellenica (Staudinger, 1871)
Ancylosis muliebris (Meyrick, 1937)
Ancylosis nervosella (Zerny, 1914)
Ancylosis nigripunctella (Staudinger, 1879)
Ancylosis ochracea (Staudinger, 1870)
Ancylosis pallida (Staudinger, 1870)
Ancylosis pectinatella (Ragonot, 1887)
Ancylosis plumbatella (Ragonot, 1888)
Ancylosis pyrethrella (Herrich-Schäffer, 1860)
Ancylosis rhodochrella (Herrich-Schäffer, 1855)
Ancylosis roscidella (Eversmann, 1844)
Ancylosis sabulosella (Staudinger, 1879)
Ancylosis samaritanella (Zeller, 1867)
Ancylosis syrtella (Ragonot, 1887)
Ancylosis xylinella (Staudinger, 1870)
Subgenus Cabotia Ragonot, 1888
Ancylosis lacteicostella (Ragonot, 1887)
Ancylosis leucocephala (Staudinger, 1879)
Ancylosis oblitella (Zeller, 1848)
Subgenus Syria Ragonot, 1887
Ancylosis arenosella (Staudinger, 1859)
Ancylosis citrinella (Ragonot, 1887)
Subgenus unknown
Ancylosis aeola Balinsky, 1987
Ancylosis albidella Ragonot, 1888
Ancylosis albifrontella (Asselbergs, 2010)
Ancylosis aspilatella (Ragonot, 1887)
Ancylosis atrisparsella (Hampson, 1901)
Ancylosis biflexella (Lederer, 1855)
Ancylosis brunneella Chrétien, 1911
Ancylosis calcariella (Ragonot & Hampson in Ragonot, 1901)
Ancylosis cinnamomeifascia (Rothschild, 1915)
Ancylosis costistrigella (Ragonot, 1890)
Ancylosis decentella (Ragonot, 1887)
Ancylosis deserticola Staudinger, 1870
Ancylosis detersella Hampson, 1926
Ancylosis discocellularis Strand, 1920
Ancylosis dumetella (Ragonot, 1887)
Ancylosis eremicola (Amsel, 1935)
Ancylosis euclastella (Ragonot, 1887)
Ancylosis eugraphella Balinsky, 1987
Ancylosis glaphyria Balinsky, 1987
Ancylosis griseomixtella (Ragonot, 1887)
Ancylosis ianthemis (Meyrick, 1887)
Ancylosis insularella (Ragonot, 1893)
Ancylosis interjectella (Ragonot, 1888)
Ancylosis iranella Ragonot, 1887
Ancylosis maculifera Staudinger, 1870
Ancylosis magnifica (Butler, 1875)
Ancylosis mimeugraphella Balinsky, 1989
Ancylosis monella (Roesler, 1973)
Ancylosis morbosella Staudinger, 1879
Ancylosis morrisonella (Ragonot, 1887)
Ancylosis namibiella Balinsky, 1987
Ancylosis nubeculella (Ragonot, 1887)
Ancylosis obscuripunctella Roesler, 1973 (the replacement name for Ancylosis nigripunctella (Amsel, 1959), a junior secondary homonym of Ancylosis nigripunctella (Staudinger, 1879))
Ancylosis ocellella (Ragonot, 1901)
Ancylosis ochraceella Asselbergs, 2008
Ancylosis ochricostella Ragonot, 1887
Ancylosis ormuzdella Amsel, 1954
Ancylosis pallidimarginalis (Rothschild, 1915)
Ancylosis partitella Ragonot, 1887
Ancylosis pectinatella (de Joannis, 1915)
Ancylosis platynephes (de Joannis, 1927)
Ancylosis rhythmatica (Dyar, 1914)
Ancylosis rufifasciella (Hampson, 1901)
Ancylosis semidiscella Ragonot, 1888
Ancylosis similis Balinsky, 1987
Ancylosis singhalella (Ragonot in de Joannis & Ragonot, 1889)
Ancylosis subpyrethrella (Ragonot, 1888)
Ancylosis sulcatella (Christoph, 1877)
Ancylosis thiosticha Turner, 1947
Ancylosis trimaculella (D. Lucas, 1943)
Ancylosis ulmiarrosorella Clemens, 1860
Ancylosis undulatella (Clemens, 1860)
Ancylosis velessa (Dyar, 1914)
Ancylosis versicolorella (Ragonot, 1887)
Ancylosis yerburii (Butler, 1884)

References

 
Phycitini
Pyralidae genera